The Christian Political Movement (CPM) is a South African political party led by Brian Lonwabo Mahlati, the founder of the New Life Family Bible Church, based in Mdantsane.

It was established in 2014 (and officially registered with the Independent Electoral Commission in 2018) by a group of pastors and leaders from numerous South African churches.

The party contested the 2019 general election, and Mahlati stated that he was confident the CPM would win.

The party failed to win any seats.

Election results

National elections

|-
! Election
! Total votes
! Share of vote
! Seats 
! +/–
! Government
|-
! 2019
| 4,980
| 0.03%
| 
| –
| 
|}

Provincial elections

! rowspan=2 | Election
! colspan=2 | Eastern Cape
! colspan=2 | Free State
! colspan=2 | Gauteng
! colspan=2 | Kwazulu-Natal
! colspan=2 | Limpopo
! colspan=2 | Mpumalanga
! colspan=2 | North-West
! colspan=2 | Northern Cape
! colspan=2 | Western Cape
|-
! % !! Seats
! % !! Seats
! % !! Seats
! % !! Seats
! % !! Seats
! % !! Seats
! % !! Seats
! % !! Seats
! % !! Seats
|-
! 2019
| 0.05% || 0/63
| - || -
| - || -
| - || -
| - || -
| - || -
| - || -
| - || -
| - || -
|}

References

2014 establishments in South Africa
Christian democratic parties in South Africa
Political parties established in 2014
Political parties in South Africa